Ethan Ryan (born 12 May 1996) is an Ireland international rugby league footballer who plays as a  or  for Hull Kingston Rovers in the Betfred Super League.

He previously played for the Bradford Bulls in the Betfred Championship and League 1.

Background
Ryan was born in Halifax, West Yorkshire, England.

He is a product of the Bradford Bulls Academy system and signed his first professional contract in October 2015. Ryan previously played for local amateur sides Queensbury and West Bowling ARLFC and was also part of Keighley scholarship.

Bradford Bulls
2016 - 2016 Season

Ryan featured in the pre-season friendlies against the Leeds Rhinos and the Castleford Tigers. Ryan featured in Round 5 (Oldham). He played in Round 7 against the London Broncos then in Round 10 (Dewsbury Rams). Ryan played in Round 17 Workington Town then in Round 19 Halifax. He played in Round 21 Whitehaven to Round 23 Featherstone Rovers. Ryan featured in the Championship Shield in Game 3 Oldham to the Semi Final Dewsbury. Midway through the season Ryan extended his contract by two years.

2017 - 2017 Season
Ryan featured in the pre-season friendly against the Keighley Cougars. Ryan featured in Round 1 against Hull Kingston Rovers to Round 16 against Dewsbury then in Round 19 Oldham R.L.F.C.|Oldham to Round 21 against Hull Kingston Rovers. He played in the Championship Shield Game 5 Sheffield Eagles to Game 7 Rochdale Hornets. Ryan also played in the 2017 Challenge Cup in Round 4 against Featherstone Rovers. At the end of the season, Ryan signed with Leigh however following Leigh Centurions' relegation from Super League he signed a two-year extension to stay with the Bradford club.

2018 - 2018 Season

Ryan featured in the pre-season friendlies against the Sheffield Eagles, Dewsbury, Toronto Wolfpack and the Keighley Cougars. Ryan featured in Round 1 against York to Round 25 Oldham R.L.F.C. then in the Semi Final against Oldham R.L.F.C. to the Final Workington Town. Ryan also played in the 2018 Challenge Cup in Round 3 West Wales Raiders to Round 5 against Warrington.

2019 - 2019 Season

Ryan featured in the pre-season friendlies against Halifax R.L.F.C., Dewsbury, Batley and the Toronto Wolfpack. Ryan featured in Round 1 Featherstone Rovers to Round 27 against Rochdale. Ryan also played in the 2019 Challenge Cup in Round 4 the Keighley Cougars to Quarter Final Halifax R.L.F.C. At the end of the 2019 season, Ryan signed a two-year deal with Super League side Hull Kingston Rovers.

Statistics
Statistics do not include pre-season friendlies.

References

External links
Hull KR profile
Bradford Bulls profile
Bulls profile

1996 births
Living people
Bradford Bulls players
English rugby league players
Hull Kingston Rovers players
Ireland national rugby league team players
Rugby league centres
Rugby league players from Halifax, West Yorkshire